Time Without Clocks is a 1962 autobiographical novel by Joan Lindsay. The novel recounts Lindsay's early years married to prolific Australian artist Daryl Lindsay. The novel was published in 1962 by F. W. Cheshire, and later re-published by Penguin Books.

References

1962 Australian novels
Australian autobiographies
Novels by Joan Lindsay